The Frauen-Bundesliga 2006–07 was the 17th season of the Frauen-Bundesliga, Germany's premier football league. It began on 10 September 2006 and ended on 10 June 2007.

Final standings

Results

Top scorers

References

2006-07
Ger
1
Women1